Kostajnica Fortress is a castle in Hrvatska Kostajnica, a town in central Croatia, near the border to Bosnia and Herzegovina.

The fortress was built most probably in the 14th century and owned by the members of the noble families Frankopan, Lipovečki, Tot, Benvenjud and finally (in the 16th century) Zrinski, so it is today also known as "Zrinski fortress" or "Zrinski castle". It was conquered by the Ottomans on 17 July 1556, but it was freed from their rule relatively fast, in 1688.

Situated on the banks of the river Una, the fortress has very strong walls and three towers. Having been in a state of disrepair before, it has been renewed in recent years by the Croatian Ministry of Culture.

Sources

External links

The town of Croatian Kostajnica
Official tourist information page
An outline of the archaeological topography of the Kostajnica and Dvor region

Castles in Croatia
Buildings and structures in Sisak-Moslavina County
Tourist attractions in Sisak-Moslavina County